Uhehlia nerissidioides is a species of leaf beetle of the Democratic Republic of the Congo, described by Heinrich Kuntzen in 1912.

References

Eumolpinae
Beetles of the Democratic Republic of the Congo
Beetles described in 1912
Endemic fauna of the Democratic Republic of the Congo